David Barkley (born 14 June 1950) is a former Australian rules footballer who played for Geelong in the Victorian Football League (now known as the Australian Football League).

References 

1950 births
Living people
Geelong Football Club players
University Blues Football Club players
Australian rules footballers from Victoria (Australia)
People educated at Geelong College